Anne Murray's Christmas Album is the seventh Christmas album release by Canadian Country artist Anne Murray.

The disc was released in October, 2008 through Manhattan Records, and features ten previously released cuts; four new recordings completed in 2008; and a previously unissued live recording from 2001 with Diana Krall.  The four newly recorded cuts are Murray's final studio recordings, as she announced her retirement from show business in 2008.  As of 2022, Murray remains in full retirement with this being her last release.

Track listing

A Previously unreleased.

Chart performance

References

2008 Christmas albums
Christmas albums by Canadian artists
Anne Murray compilation albums
2008 compilation albums
Christmas compilation albums
Manhattan Records albums
Country Christmas albums